Pain Khaf Rural District is a rural district (dehestan) in Sangan District, Khaf County, Razavi Khorasan province, Iran. At the 2006 census, its population was 3,692, in 830 families.  The rural district has 3 villages.

References 

Rural Districts of Razavi Khorasan Province
Khaf County